The 1929–30 Eintracht Frankfurt season was the 30th season in the club's football history. In 1929–30 the club played in the Bezirksliga Main-Hessen, then one of many top tiers of German football. It was the club's 3rd season in the Bezirksliga Main-Hessen.

The season ended up with Eintracht winning the South German championship for the first time, but later losing to Holstein Kiel in the quarter-final in the run for the German championship knockout stage.

Matches

Legend

Friendlies

Bezirksliga Main-Hessen

League table

Results by round

Matches

South German Championship round, North West division

Fixtures and results

German Championship knockout stage

Squad

Squad and statistics

|}

Transfers

In:

Out:

See also
 1930 German football championship

Notes

Sources

External links
 Official English Eintracht website 
 German archive site

1929-30
German football clubs 1929–30 season